Radijas 9 is a music radio station that is licensed to Klaipėda, Lithuania. The station began broadcasting on 29 June 1995.

Programs 
 Labas Rytas, Klaipėda
 Savas Braižas
 Ekomisija
 Svečias Studijoje
 Ant a lot of others

References

External links

Radio stations in Lithuania
2004 establishments in Lithuania
Mass media in Klaipėda